Saint Flavia may refer to:

Flavia Domitilla (wife of Clemens)
Flavia Domitilla (Catholic saint)
Flavia (saint)

See also
 Saint Placidus (martyr)